Wadavali was a station on the Salsette–Trombay Railway. It was dismantled after the rail line closed down in 1934. The area is in the Trombay region of Mumbai.

References
Irfca.org
Mumbai Mirror, 25 Oct, 2005, Manoj R Nair

Defunct railway stations in India